Walter Hunt may refer to:

Walter Hunt (inventor) (1796–1859), American mechanic and inventor
Walter Hunt (politician) (1868–1942), member of the Wisconsin State Senate
W. Ben Hunt (1888–1970), American artist and author
Walter H. Hunt (born 1959), American science fiction novelist
Walter Hunt (architect) (1870–1940), architect in Australia

See also
Hunt (surname)
Hunt (disambiguation)